Shweta Rohidas Jadhav (born 27 December 1985) in a Maharashtrian cricketer. She has played 103 List A and 40 Women's Twenty20 matches. She was a part of India U21 women cricket team that toured Pakistan in season 2005–06. She has played for Maharashtra, Railways, Uttar Pradesh, Central Zone, West Zone.

References 

1985 births
Living people
Maharashtra women cricketers
Uttar Pradesh women cricketers
Railways women cricketers
Central Zone women cricketers
West Zone women cricketers